Gonzalo Villanueva (born 13 January 1995) is an Argentine tennis player.

Villanueva has a career high ATP singles ranking of 268 achieved on 10 October 2022. He also has a career high ATP doubles ranking of 278 achieved on 8 August 2022.

Villanueva made his ATP main draw debut at the 2022 Los Cabos Open after entering the singles main draw as a lucky loser.

ATP Challenger and ITF/World Tennis Tour Finals

Singles: 15 (7-8)

Doubles: 4

References

External links

1995 births
Living people
Argentine male tennis players
21st-century Argentine people